The Office of the Communications Authority (OFCA) is an executive arm of the Communications Authority in Hong Kong. It is the body responsible for telecommunications regulation (through the Regulatory Affairs Branch), antitrust enforcement (through the Competition Affairs Branch) and allocation of the radio frequency portion of the electromagnetic spectrum (also known as spectrum management, through the Operations Branch).

The OFTA, the Television and Entertainment Licensing Authority, and the Hong Kong Broadcasting Authority was merged to form the Office of the Communications Authority and the Communications Authority on 1 April 2012. The Office for Film, Newspaper and Article Administration under OFCA also formed in the same day, takes over former Television and Entertainment Licensing Authority’s other functions in relation to film classification, control of obscene and indecent articles and newspaper registration.

Notes

See also
 Television and Entertainment Licensing Authority
 Hong Kong Broadcasting Authority

2012 establishments in Hong Kong
Hong Kong government departments and agencies
Telecommunications in Hong Kong
Communications authorities
Entertainment rating organizations
Regulation in China
Communications and media organizations